The third season of Show Me the Money (SMTM3), which aired in 2014, saw a huge change in production as prominent figures of the Korean hip-hop scene participated in the show. Over 3,000 people auditioned this season, 1.5 times the amount last season, including underground rappers, non-Koreans, students, and previous SMTM contestants. The winner receives one hundred million won prize money, a record deal, and an opportunity to hold a special performance.

Notable contestants that did not make it to the Top 16 include ODEE of Vismajor, Beall, Changmo, Sapo, New Champ, Kang Chun-hyok (a North Korean rapper and artist), Tymee (E.via), Jolly V., Kisum, ult from Kinetic Flow, Born Kim, Kim Hyo-eun and Tarae.

The show, however, had been criticized for its editing by its producers and contestants. Despite this, songs from the show have successfully dominated music charts more than once.

Producer Teams (Judges) 
Team Brand New Music ("Team Swings & San E"):
 Swings: Previous contestant of SMTM2
 San E
Team Illionaire ("Team Dok2 & The Quiett"):
 Dok2
 The Quiett
Team YDG:
 Yang Dong-geun
Team YG ("Team Tablo & Masta Wu")
 Tablo
 Masta Wu

Teams (Top 16) 
Team YG
 Olltii
 B.I
 Yuk Ji-dam
 Snacky Chan
Team YDG
 Iron
 Giriboy
 Han Sangyup
 Jung Sangsoo
Team Illionaire
 Bobby
 Chamane
 Toy
 Pyungan
Team Brand New
 Vasco (now known as BILL STAX)
 C Jamm
 Boo Hyunsuk
 Sung Janggun

Rounds

Round One - First Round Auditions 
Groups of one hundred contestants come up at a time, and one by one contestants must rap a cappella in front of a producer. In order to pass onto the next round, contestants must meet the producer's judging criteria and be given the SMTM necklace. In particular, YDG caused much commotion by using his ambiguous judging criteria to pass rappers that other judges would not have passed.

Round Two - Solo Judgement (Second Round Auditions) 
Contestants prepare a one-minute rap using a beat of their choice and perform alone in front of all the producer teams. In order to pass this round, contestants must receive at least one pass from one of the producer teams. If all four producer teams press the elimination button before the 60 seconds is up, the contestant fails. Again, YDG passed rappers that other producers did not deem appropriate, causing them to give him the nickname "hip-hop rescue team". 96 of the 3000 plus contestants from Round One made it to this round.

Round Three - 1:1 Battle (Third Round Auditions) 
Contestants pair up for a 1v1 rap battle. The host chooses a contestant at random, who is then able to pick their opponent. The two contestants will then select one of the 12 given beats to perform together within a time limit. The producers eliminate one of the two contestants based on the performance. In the event of a tie, the two contestants must rap freestyle to a beat. 46 of the 96 rappers from Round Two made it to this round.

Revival Round 
The producers picked four eliminated rappers. Picking either X or O out of a hat, the four were randomly assigned a battle.

Round Four - Team Selections (Top 16) 
A SMTM3 special concert was held in which the producer teams each gave a performance. Afterwards, contestants must select a producer team that they want to be in. If a producer team does not get at least four members, the producer team and the members that chose them will be eliminated. 

One by one, contestants must choose their desired producer team by entering the respective room. After initially choosing a room, contestants were then given a chance to switch rooms, and this saved Team Illionaire—which only had three members at first—from elimination. 25 rappers made it to this round. 8 chose Team YG; 6 chose Team Brand New; 6 chose Team Illionaire; and 5 chose Team YDG. Out of all the rappers that chose them, producer teams must choose four to form their team. This Round formed SMTM3's Top 16 rappers.

Round Five - Individual Performances 
Prior to the performance, the producers decide, using their own method, on one person to eliminate. This formed the season's Top 12 rappers.

A rapper is chosen at random to perform, and the audience votes and decides the 1st to 12th place rappers. 195 people in total voted. A team score is generated based on adding up the members' scores and the teams are then ranked: Team Illionaire came in last; Team YDG third; Team YG second, despite two of their rappers forgetting their lyrics; and Team Brand New first. The top team gets the advantage of deciding the Round Six battles.

Round Six - First Round Performances 
Round Five's winning team decided the team battles, which were: Team Brand New vs. Team Illionaire, and Team YDG vs. Team YG. Members of each team were ranked 1st, 2nd, and 3rd from Round Five. The top rapper automatically gets to perform and go to the next Round, but the producers must choose one person out of 2nd and 3rd place rappers to perform, thereby eliminating the other. The 2nd and 3rd place are to prepare two versions of the same song, and on the day of the rehearsal the producers conducts the selection, based on the rappers' performance. This formed the Top 6 rappers. Vasco, IRON, Bobby, and B.I were first in their teams last Round and guaranteed a spot in the first round performances.

During their performance, each rapper gets performance money based on votes from the audience. Team members' performance money are then added up to get the team's overall performance money. The losing team of the team battles gets their lowest-earning performer eliminated.

Round Seven - First Round of Finals 
The theme is "Love". Rappers collaborate with a special guest rapper.

Again, each rapper gets performance money during their performance based on votes from the audience. Team members' performance money are then added up to get the team's overall performance money. The losing team of the team battles gets their lowest-earning performer eliminated. Team YG was completely eliminated.

Round Eight - Semi-finals 
The match list for the semi-finals was decided by the top winner last round, C Jamm. The theme is "Money". Team Brand New remained undefeated until this round, but Bobby won Vasco by a difference of 10 votes. Team Brand New was completely eliminated.

Round Nine - Final Round 
Bobby won the first round of voting, as well as the final results. After losing continuously throughout the whole season, Team Illionaire won Show Me the Money 3.

Top Contestants 
Top 12:
 Team Brand New: C Jamm, Vasco, Boo Hyunsuk
 Team YDG: Iron, Giriboy, Han Sangyup
 Team YG: Olltii, B.I, Yook Jidam
 Team Illionaire: Bobby, Chamane, Toy
Top 8:
 Team Brand New: C Jamm, Vasco
 Team YDG: Iron, Giriboy
 Team YG: Olltii, B.I
 Team Illionaire: Bobby, Chamane
Top 6:
 Team Brand New: C Jamm, Vasco
 Team YDG: Iron, Giriboy
 Team YG: Olltii
 Team Illionaire: Bobby
Semi-finalists (Top 4):
 Team Brand New: C Jamm, Vasco
 Team YDG: Iron
 Team Illionaire: Bobby
Finalists:
 Team YDG: Iron 
 Team Illionaire: Bobby 
Winner:
 Team Illionaire: Bobby

Discography

References 

Show Me the Money (South Korean TV series)
2014 South Korean television seasons